KSVP (990 AM) is a radio station airing a News/Talk format licensed to Artesia, New Mexico. The station is owned by Pecos Valley Broadcasting Company.

References

External links

News and talk radio stations in the United States
SVP